DC Comics is one of the largest comic book and graphic novel publishers in North America. DC has published comic books under a number of different imprints and corporate names. This page lists all series, mini-series, limited series, and graphic novels published under the imprints All-Star, ABC, CMX, DC Focus, Helix, Homage, Impact, Johnny DC, Milestone, Minx, Paradox Press, Piranha Press, Tangent, Vertigo, WildStorm, and Young Animal as well as those Amalgam Comics published by DC.

A list of DC Comics published under the DC or AA imprint can be found here.

A list of DC Archive Editions can be found here.

A list of DC Comics trade paperback reprint collections can be found here.

A list of DC Comics imprints reprint collections can be found here.

Titles under DC

All-Star
The All-Star line intended to reinterpret DC's most recognizable characters in their purest, iconic forms. All Star Batgirl and All Star Wonder Woman were announced but never released.

Amalgam
Amalgam Comics was a title shared by DC and Marvel Comics for a Fifth-week event. The following were the titles published by DC, others were published by Marvel.

DC Focus
DC Focus was a short-lived imprint featuring people with super powers who did not necessarily become heroes.

Johnny DC
Johnny DC was a DC comics imprint for a younger audience, who published animated series and Cartoon Network related material.

Tangent
Tangent Comics was a title used for two Fifth-week events. For Tangent: Superman's Reign, see List of DC Comics publications.

CMX
An imprint reprinting manga.

Helix
Helix was short-lived science fiction imprint for mature readers. It was ultimately folded into Vertigo.

Impact
Impact Comics printed superhero comics licensed from Archie Comics.

Milestone Media
Milestone Media was a creator-owned imprint licensed to DC. In 2008, Milestone Media characters became part of the DC Universe.

Minx

Paradox Press

Piranha Press
Published from 1989 to 1993, Piranha Press was DC's alternative comics line.

Vertigo

Wildstorm

 
Imprint